Wildcat was a short-lived British comic which ran fortnightly from 1988 to 1989. It was a science fiction comic about colonists fleeing Earth in a spaceship called Wildcat just before the planet is destroyed in the year 2500. It featured five stories in each issue: one continuing series for each of the four main characters as they explore an alien planet to see if it is fit for habitation, and a fifth story set on board the ship, which was a single-episode story each week.

The four lead characters were Turbo Jones, a millionaire who financed the expedition and the mission commander; Loner, a black mercenary; Kitten Magee, a woman youthful in appearance but with a secretly prolonged life-span; and Joe Alien, an alien with telescopic limbs, and last survivor of his own race.

A prelude issue was given away for free with other comics, containing a single story explaining the premise, written by editor Barrie Tomlinson and illustrated by Ian Kennedy. The comic then ran for twelve issues, priced 40p, before being cancelled and merged with Eagle. The series Turbo Jones, Loner, Kitten Magee and Joe Alien continued in the Eagle on rotation until April 1990. There were also a holiday special and a winter special, both in 1989.

Tomlinson's son James wrote Kitten Magee under the pseudonym James Nicholas.

After Rebellion Developments bought the rights to IPC's back catalogue of comics in 2016, it announced that it would reprint most of the stories from Wildcat under its Treasury of British Comics imprint, starting with Turbo Jones in January 2019 and then Loner in September 2019.

References

 "Cat O'Four Tales" by Stephen Jewell, in Judge Dredd Megazine #403, 15 January 2019, pp 40–43.

External links
 Wildcat at the Grand Comics Database